It's the First Day of School...Forever! is a children's horror novel by R. L. Stine. The novel is about a middle school boy who relives a terrifying first day of school over and over again. It was reported in 2011 that the book was in works for a film. An audio book of the novel was released.

There was a similar time loop theme in the second of the Help! I'm Trapped... series by Todd Strasser, Help! I'm Trapped in the First Day of School.

References

2011 American novels
2011 children's books
American children's novels
American horror novels
Novels about time travel
Novels set in high schools and secondary schools
Feiwel & Friends books